Lamar Myles (born January 7, 1986, in Winter Haven, Florida) is a former American football linebacker. He was signed by the Jacksonville Jaguars as an undrafted free agent in 2008. He played college football at Louisville.

Early years
Myles graduated from Lake Region High School in Eagle Lake, Florida.

Professional career

Jacksonville Jaguars
Myles was signed by the Jacksonville Jaguars as an undrafted free agent in 2008. He was waived by the team on August 30 during final cuts. He was re-signed to the team's practice squad on September 17, only to be released a week later on September 24. He was re-signed to the practice squad again on October 6.

He was waived/injured on August 24, 2009, and subsequently reverted to injured reserve. He was released with an injury settlement on August 30. He was re-signed to the practice squad on November 24.

External links
Jacksonville Jaguars bio
Louisville Cardinals bio

1986 births
Living people
People from Winter Haven, Florida
Players of American football from Florida
American football linebackers
Louisville Cardinals football players
Jacksonville Jaguars players